The Bristol Record Society is a text publication society which publishes scholarly editions of historical records and texts relating to the history of the City of Bristol. Founded in 1929, it is one of the oldest such societies devoted to the publication of material relating to an individual town or city. Through its history, it has typically published at least one volume each year, on matters ranging from the civic charters of the medieval city, to the diary of Sarah Fox, an 18th-century Quaker. The core aims of the Society have long been to promote historical research into the City of Bristol by making available, in print form, records that relate to the history of the city.

Like many other record societies, the Bristol Record Society is now also seeking to make more of the city's records available in electronic form. To this effect it has announced, for instance, its intention to make many of its back issues available via bodies such as Google Books.

References

External links
Bristol Record Society

1929 establishments in the United Kingdom
Heritage organisations in the United Kingdom
History of Bristol
Text publication societies